Karavanserai-ye Shalil (also Romanized as Kāravānserāī-ye Shalīl; also known as Kārevānsarā) is a village in Shalil Rural District, Miankuh District, Ardal County, Chaharmahal and Bakhtiari Province, Iran. At the 2006 census, its population was 21, in 4 families. The village is populated by Lurs.

References 

Populated places in Ardal County
Luri settlements in Chaharmahal and Bakhtiari Province